Nathaniel William Levin (4 May 1818 – 30 April 1903) was a merchant and politician in New Zealand.

Wellington, New Zealand
Levin, born in 1818 in London, England, came to the new settlement of Wellington in 1841 and set himself up in business selling drapery hosiery and haberdashery on Lambton Quay in partnership with Abraham Hort junior who would become his brother-in-law.

Levin & Co
The business soon moved to importing food and liquor and exporting whale oil and whale bone and gradually established itself as a shipping and land agency. Sheepfarming grew as whaling declined and wool exports replaced the whaling products. In 1862 he went into partnership with Charles Johnson Pharazyn. By 1868 Levin was depressed by the stagnation of the business of the colony and decided to arrange his affairs so he might return to England. He ended his partnership with Pharazyn and the business activities were taken over by his eldest son W H Levin in partnership with Charles Pharazyn and Walter Woods Johnston. At the end of 1869 he and his wife left for England.

Redfern Alexander & Co
He became a partner in the firm of his former London agents for 12 years, retired in 1882 in his mid-60s and died in 1903. His wife Jessie died the following year.

In 1999, Levin was posthumously inducted into the New Zealand Business Hall of Fame.

Parliament
Nathaniel Levin was the first Jew to be appointed to the New Zealand Legislative Council.  He served from 25 June 1869 until his membership lapsed on 11 January 1871; he had returned to England at the end of 1869. In the Legislative Council, he distinguished himself by never having made a speech.

His son William Levin continued his trading company in Wellington.

See also
History of the Jews in New Zealand

References

1818 births
1903 deaths
New Zealand merchants
Members of the New Zealand Legislative Council
New Zealand businesspeople
Businesspeople from London
English emigrants to New Zealand
English Jews
New Zealand Jews
New Zealand people of English-Jewish descent
Jewish New Zealand history
19th-century New Zealand politicians
Wellington City Councillors
19th-century English businesspeople